Chōkōsō no Akebono is a 1969 Japanese film about the construction of the Kasumigaseki Building, the first high-rise building in Japan. Kajima Construction, the builder of the Kasumigaseki building, was also the backer of the film. Mark Schilling of The Japan Times said that Kajima reportedly pushed 1.7 million advance tickets on its subcontractors and on ramen vendors who sold lunch to Kajima employees.

Cast
 Ryō Ikebe as Ejiri
 Tetsurō Tanba as Kinoshita
 Isao Kimura as Saeki
 Mikijiro Hira 
 Masakazu Tamura as Shimamura
 Yoshiko Sakuma as Naoko
 Nobuo Nakamura as Furukawa
 Michiyo Aratama
 Kuniko Miyake
 Tanie Kitabayashi
 Ichirō Sugai as Isobe
 Junzaburō Ban as Hoshino
 Nenji Kobayashi
 Eijirō Yanagi as Okabayashi
 Akiji Kobayashi as Komori
 Fumio Watanabe as Takemoto
 Matsumoto Hakuō I as Kawashima
 Shūji Sano as Kashima

References

External links

 
 

1969 films
Japanese drama films
Films scored by Masaru Sato
1960s Japanese films